KPUR-FM (95.7 FM, "Texas Country 95.7, The Armadillo") is a radio station serving the Amarillo, Texas, area with a country format. This station is under ownership of Cumulus Media. Its studios are located at the Amarillo Building downtown on Polk Street, and its transmitter tower is based southeast of Amarillo in unincorporated Randall County.

The station is an affiliate of the Dallas Cowboys radio network.

On January 15, 2018, the then-KARX switched frequencies with KPUR-FM and changed its name from "Nash Icon 95.7" to "Texas Country 95.7, The Armadillo". The stations swapped call signs on January 24, 2018, with KARX picking up the KPUR-FM call sign.

References

External links

PUR-FM
Country radio stations in the United States
Radio stations established in 1992
Cumulus Media radio stations
1992 establishments in Texas